Bernard Bosanquet may refer to:

 Bernard Bosanquet (cricketer) (1877–1936), English cricketer credited with inventing the googly
 Bernard Bosanquet (philosopher) (1848–1923), English philosopher